Seyyed Abbas (also Romanized as Seyyed ʿAbbās; also known as Varkuh (Persian: ورکوه), also Romanized as Varkūh) is a village in Itivand-e Jonubi Rural District, Kakavand District, Delfan County, Lorestan Province, Iran. At the 2006 census, its population was 68, in 15 families.

References 

Towns and villages in Delfan County